South Surrey—White Rock—Langley was a federal electoral district in British Columbia, Canada, that was represented in the House of Commons of Canada from 1997 to 2004.

Geography 
This electoral district included the City of White Rock and City of Langley, as well as the southern portions of the Township of Langley and the City of Surrey.

History 
This riding was created in 1996 from Fraser Valley West and Surrey—White Rock—South Langley ridings.

In 2003, it was abolished and parts of it went to help form Langley and South Surrey—White Rock—Cloverdale ridings.

Members of Parliament 

This riding elected only one Member of Parliament:

 1997-2004: Val Meredith - Reform (1997-2000), Canadian Alliance (2000-2003), Conservative (2003-2004) - She previously represented Surrey—White Rock—South Langley.

Election results

See also 

 List of Canadian federal electoral districts
 Past Canadian electoral districts

External links 
 Library of Parliament Riding Profile 1996-2003
 Expenditures - 2000
 Expenditures – 1997
 Website of the Parliament of Canada

Former federal electoral districts of British Columbia